Thomas Jefferson Davis Jr. (1912–1989) was an American businessman and investor. He was an early Silicon Valley venture capitalist and founder of the Mayfield Fund.

Early life
He was born in 1912 in Cincinnati, Davis earned his A.B. and J.D. degrees from Harvard University and served in World War II on the War Production Board, the Lend-Lease Administration and in the Office of Strategic Services as an Army captain. He was often behind Japanese lines, as detailed in his 223-page privately published book One Man's War.

Career
Davis was the Vice President of Kern County Land Company from 1957 to 1961. He managed its investment in four new companies including Watkins-Johnson Company, which investment of $900,000 was sold in 1968 and 1973 by Tenneco, successor to Kern, for over $80 million.

With Arthur Rock, he formed the Davis and Rock partnership in 1961, which made many hugely successful investments including Teledyne, Apple Computer and Intel. With Wally Davis and Stanford University, he formed in 1969 another partnership, Mayfield Fund, which also brought great returns not only to its limited partners, but also to Stanford. This fund helped start more than 125 companies in high-technology fields.

He died in 1989 before the book was compiled by Jeff McNish and published.

Personal life
He lived in Woodside, California. He was married to the former Shirley Ross. They had six daughters and 11 grandchildren. He also had a sister, Virginia Loomis of Oyster Bay and  a brother, Laurence, of Homosassa, Florida.

Awards
In 1987, Davis was an Award Recipient for the EY Entrepreneur of the Year Award in the Northern California Region.

Further reading
Portraits of Success, Carolyn Caddes, Tioga Publishing, Palo Alto, CA, 1986; 
One Man's War—A Boston Lawyer on the Jungle Trails of Burma, Thomas J. Davis Jr., privately published, copyright 1989, ASIN/ISBN B0007C3GQQ, pages 96–97

References

1912 births
1989 deaths
American computer businesspeople
American investors
Businesspeople from Cincinnati
Harvard Law School alumni
Private equity and venture capital investors
20th-century American businesspeople